The Pan-Arab colors are black, white, green and red. Individually, each of the four Pan-Arab colors were intended to represent a certain aspect of the Arabs and their history. 

The black represents the Black Standard used by the Rashidun Caliphate and the Abbasid Caliphate, while white was the dynastic color of the Umayyad Caliphate. Green is a color associated with the primary religion of Islam – and therefore also a color representative of the Rashidun Caliphate. Green is also identified as the color of the Fatimid Caliphate by some modern sources, but that is not correct: their dynastic color was white. Finally, red was the Hashemite dynastic color. The four colors also derived their potency from a verse by 14th century Arab poet Safi al-Din al-Hilli: "White are our acts, black our battles, green our fields, and red our swords."

Pan-Arab colors, used individually in the past, were first combined in 1916 in the flag of the Arab Revolt or Flag of Hejaz, designed by the British diplomat Sir Mark Sykes. Many current flags are based on Arab Revolt colors, such as the flags of Jordan, Kuwait, Palestine, the Sahrawi Arab Democratic Republic, and the United Arab Emirates.

In the 1950s, a subset of the Pan-Arab colors, the Arab Liberation colors, came to prominence. These consist of a tricolor of red, white and black bands, with green given less prominence or not included. The Arab Liberation tricolor or the Arab Liberation Flag was mainly inspired by the Egyptian Revolution of 1952 and Egypt's official flag under president Mohamed Naguib. which became the basis for the current flags of Egypt, Iraq, Sudan, Syria and Yemen (and formerly in the flags of the rival states of North Yemen and South Yemen), and in the short-lived Arab unions of the United Arab Republic and the Federation of Arab Republics.

Current flags with Pan-Arab colors

UN member and observer states

Unrecognized and partially recognized states

First-level administrative divisions

Former national flags with the Pan-Arab colors

Flags of Arab political and paramilitary movements using Pan-Arab colors

See also 
 Black Standard
 Islamic flags
 List of Arab flags
 Pan-African colors
 Pan-Arabism
 Pan-Slavic colors
 Tricolor

References

External links 
 Pan-Arab colors
 Evolution of the Arab Flag, by Dr. Mahdi Abdul-Hadi (in Arabic)

Arab nationalist symbols
Color schemes
Flags by colour
Colors
Colors, Pan-Arab
Color in culture